Graeme 'Gubby' Allan (born 23 July 1954) is a former Australian rules footballer who played with Fitzroy and Collingwood in the Victorian Football League (VFL).

Allan started his career in the Victorian Football Association where he took the field for Sunshine, and he finished third in the J. J. Liston Trophy count in 1974. He debuted at Fitzroy in 1975 and became a good utility player, often used as a centreman. He was also handy around goals and kicked 25 of them in 1977 and another 26 in 1979. Collingwood acquired his services in 1981 and he participated in that year's Grand Final, on the half back flank. During his time in the VFL he represented the league at interstate football.

Since retiring as a player, Allan has continued to be involved in football as an administrator, at Collingwood, Brisbane Lions,   and St Kilda Football Clubs.

His son, Marcus, played briefly at Brisbane, and now plays for the Old Xaverians in the VAFA, along with his youngest son, Patrick "Pat" Allan. Pat Allen has developed an infamous 40 year plan in a fantasy football league run by Andrew "Dunts" Dunton.

References

Holmesby, Russell and Main, Jim (2007). The Encyclopedia of AFL Footballers. 7th ed. Melbourne: Bas Publishing.

External links

1954 births
Living people
Australian rules footballers from Victoria (Australia)
Fitzroy Football Club players
Collingwood Football Club players
Sunshine Football Club (VFA) players
Victorian State of Origin players
Collingwood Football Club administrators
Brisbane Lions administrators
Greater Western Sydney Giants administrators